The 9th TVyNovelas Awards, is an Academy of special awards to the best of soap operas and TV shows. The awards ceremony took place on April 8, 1991 in the Centro de Espectáculos “Premier“, México D.F. The ceremony was televised in the Mexico by Canal de las estrellas.

Juan Calderón, Gloria Calzada, Rebecca de Alba, Gabriela Goldsmith and Lucero hosted the show. Yo compro esa mujer won 5 awards the most for the evening. Other winners Alcanzar una estrella, won 3 awards including Best Telenovela of the Year, also Cuando llega el amor, Mi pequeña Soledad, and Días sin luna won 3 awards and Destino won 1 award.

Summary of awards and nominations

Winners and nominees

Novelas

Others

Special Awards
Most Outstanding Foreign Singer: Ricardo Montaner
Female Musical Career: Rocío Dúrcal
Male Musical Career: José Luis Rodríguez "El puma"
Artistic Lifetime Achievement: Evita Muñoz "Chachita"
Best series aired for 5 consecutive years Mujer, casos de la vida real: Silvia Pinal
Recognition by Foreign Mexican Musical Diffusion: Familia Mora Arriaga
The Most Beautiful Hair of Telenovelas: Daniela Castro and Raúl Araiza

Missing
Winners who were not present to accept their award:
Veronica Castro, Best Actress
Omar Fierro, Best Young Lead Actor
Luis Miguel, Outstanding Male Singer

References 

TVyNovelas Awards
TVyNovelas Awards
TVyNovelas Awards
TVyNovelas Awards ceremonies